Hatherleigh Railway Station was a station on the North Devon and Cornwall Junction Light Railway between Torrington and Halwill Junction, serving the town of Hatherleigh. Hatherleigh was the largest place with a station on the line, though the town was almost two miles away. Like others on this line, the station itself was small but it was a passing place on the mainly single-track railway. The stationmaster at Hatherleigh also looked after the other stations on the line, even those, such as Petrockstow and Hole, that were staffed.

The line was opened in 1925 and was operated by the Southern Railway, though it remained a private line until it became part of the Southern Region of British Railways in 1948. The line closed in 1965 as part of the Beeching proposals, goods services having been withdrawn the previous year.

References

See also 
List of closed railway stations in Britain

Disused railway stations in Devon
Former Southern Railway (UK) stations
Railway stations in Great Britain opened in 1925
Railway stations in Great Britain closed in 1965
Beeching closures in England
Hatherleigh